Battle, fall, siege or sack of Ctesiphon may refer to:

 Battle of Ctesiphon (116), under Roman Emperor Trajan
 Battle of Ctesiphon (165), under Lucius Verus
 Battle of Ctesiphon (198), under Septimius Severus
 Battle of Ctesiphon (263), under Odaenathus
 Battle of Ctesiphon (283), under Carus
 Battle of Ctesiphon (298), under Galerius
 Battle of Ctesiphon (363), between Roman emperor Julian the Apostate & Persian emperor Shapur II outside the walls of Ctesiphon
 Siege of Ctesiphon (629), between the forces of Shahrbaraz and Ardashir III, successful
 Siege of Ctesiphon (637), the Arabian Rashidun army captures the Sasanian capital
 Battle of Ctesiphon (1915), between the British and Ottoman empires

Sieges of Ctesiphon